The 1904 Detroit College Tigers football team  was an American football team that represented Detroit College (renamed the University of Detroit in 1911) as an independent during the 1904 college football season. In its second season under head coach Alfred W. Debo, the team compiled a 4–2 record and outscored its opponents by a combined total of 76 to 28.

Schedule

References

Detroit College Tigers
Detroit Titans football seasons
Detroit College Tigers football
Detroit College Tigers football